Congress (Jagjivan) was a political party in India. It was formed in August 1981, after Jagjivan Ram resigned from the Indian National Congress (Urs).

Ram had rallied an All India Congress Committee (U) meeting of his own, expelling party leader Devraj Urs from the party. As a direct consequence Ram was expelled from Congress (U).

The party maintained a small presence in the Indian Parliament but dissolved after Ram's death in 1986.

References

Indian National Congress breakaway groups
Defunct political parties in India
Political parties established in 1981
1981 establishments in India
Political parties disestablished in 1986
1986 disestablishments in India